Actual Radio, Colchester is an Independent Local Radio station broadcasting to Colchester & North East Essex in the United Kingdom. The station was started as a concept in 2014 by Pete Chapman, a former Essex FM presenter. The company was formed in 2016 and launched in Colchester on the 1st January 2017. On 8 September 2020, Actual Radio launched on the Essex DAB Multiplex.

History 
The station, serving a local population of around 350,000, broadcasts shows from its studio in the city centre 24 hours a day. The Colchester station has firmly established itself as the main local radio station for the area. Key people include Pete Chapman (former Essex FM presenter), Phil Terry (former Dream 100 and SGR Colchester presenter), Andre Kimche (former Dream 100 presenter), Dom Atkins (former Ipswich 102 presenter).

Technical 

Actual Radio broadcasts to Essex on the Arqiva owned Essex DAB Multiplex. Arqiva currently operates 11 transmitters in the Essex multiplex, Harlow (Rye Hill), Bakers Wood, Westley Heights, Benfleet, Southend, Great Braxted, Braintree, Colchester, Manningtree, Clacton, and Sudbury, which is just over the Essex and Suffolk border.

Digital (DAB)

The radio station also simulcasts its output online, to provide the service on smart speaker devices and on their website.

Current presenters
 Pete Chapman
 Phil Terry
 Andre Kimche
 Greg Potter
 Martin Roscoe
 Dave Gowland
 Kevin Peters
 Lawrence Ladbrook
 Loxley
 Susie Boo
 Georgie Peck
 Dave the Gardener
 Simon Baldock
 Dom Atkins

See also
Colchester
Essex
Digital Audio Broadcasting

References

External links 
 Jeremy Durrant joins Actual Radio
 The full list of the 100 most influential people in Essex for 2019
 

Radio stations in Essex
Colchester (town)
Radio stations established in 2016
2016 establishments in England